"Eloise" is a Swedish-language song written by  and Lasse Holm and performed by Swedish dansband Arvingarna. It won the Melodifestivalen 1993 and finished 7th in the Eurovision Song Contest 1993, where it represented . The country had been one of the favourites to win that year.

The song text describes a man who wants to know if a woman called Eloise is more than a friend.

The single peaked at #7 at the Swedish singles chart. At Svensktoppen, the song stayed for 10 weeks with a second place as best result there.

Cover versions
 Swedish heavy metal band Black Ingvars covered the song on their 1995 album Earcandy Six.
  performed the song at Dansbandskampen 2008.
 Timo Räisänen performed the song during Melodifestivalen 2010.

 See also 
 "Elenore", 1968 song by American pop-rock group The Turtles, which Arvingarna covered on their 1992 album Coola killar''.

Charts

External links
 "Eloise" at the Swedish singles chart

References

1993 debut singles
1993 songs
Eurovision songs of 1993
Melodifestivalen songs of 1993
Eurovision songs of Sweden
Arvingarna songs
Songs written by Lasse Holm
Songs written by Gert Lengstrand